Coatham is an area of Redcar in the borough of Redcar and Cleveland and the ceremonial county of North Yorkshire, England.

History 

There is reputed to be an entry in the Doomsday book – the first recorded reference to Coatham as "there is a Hamlet of Cotes (one-roomed cottages or shacks) on the beach where the people collect coal from boats from Hartlepool, to carry by pack animal to the Abbey at Guisborough for the heating for the monks there".  Probably the people of the Hamlet of Cotes were taxed accordingly, and the place became known as "cote-ham" or similar?
Coatham can be traced back to the 12th century, when "Roger son of William de Tocketts gave a salt-pan in 'Cotum' to Guisborough Priory."
There was a significant port there, owned by the de Brus family in the 13th century.  The weekly market of Kirkleatham parish was held in Coatham (possibly because of the presence of the port) and there was a three-day fair.  These were chartered in 1257 by King Henry III

Though Coatham is now only a  district in the town of Redcar, the need for definition was strong enough to warrant the western boundary being marked by a fence which ran the length of West Dyke Road and West Terrace.
Coatham comprises the remaining coastal land north of the railway line from West Dyke Road to Warrenby in the west.
The present-day Redcar & Cleveland College was a grammar school before 1975 named Sir William Turners.

Coatham Pier 

Between 1875 and 1898, Coatham had a leisure pier. In October 1898, the pier was struck by the  Finnish freighter Birger. The ship had developed trouble during a storm in the North Sea and despite passing Grimsby, Scarborough and Whitby, she carried on for South Shields. During a ferocious storm she crashed onto the rocks at Coatham and wrecked a  section of the pier in the middle. Only two members of her crew of 15 were rescued; the pier collapsed a year later.

Landmarks 

The majority of modern Coatham is Victorian housing, most notably at its northern tip by the Coatham Hotel built in 1860.
A small boating lake, leisure centre, arcade complex and caravan park now occupies the remainder of Coatham's coast.
To the east, the Tees Valley Wildlife Trust's Coatham Marsh Nature Reserve hosts  of ancient Marsh and grassland.

Future development 

Since the mid-1990s political debate has been generated amongst Coatham's five thousand residents as to the future of the last undeveloped section of Coatham's coastal land known as Coatham Common/Coatham Enclosure - for the last 25 years used as a golf course and local recreation area.
Residents are objecting at losing open space to the council's proposed housing and leisure development planned to revive the tourist industry.
The Supreme Court of the United Kingdom announced on 3 March 2010 that Redcar Council must register the land as a Village Green.

Notable residents 

Coatham is the town where Jane Gardam, twice winner of the Whitbread Prize, was brought up and where some of her novels are set.

References

External links 

 Coatham Marsh Wildlife Images
 A Redcar History site
 National Statistics - Coatham Ward 2001
 Tees Valley Wildlife Trust
 Redcar & Cleveland Borough Council - Coatham Neighbourhood Service

Redcar
Places in the Tees Valley
Villages in North Yorkshire
Populated coastal places in Redcar and Cleveland